Zhenjiang District is a district of Shaoguan, a city in northern Guangdong Province (Yuebei), China. Zhenjiang is seat of Shaoguan. As of 2021, there are 10 county-level administrative divisions including 3 subdistrict, 5 towns and 2 agents of Quren mineral bureau (曲仁矿务局办事处) under Zhenjiang's jurisdiction. Specific information in below:

Subdistricts
Zhenjiang District's 3 subdistricts are as follows:
 Donghe Subdistrict (东河街道)
 Chezhan Subdistrict (车站街道)
 Fengcai Subdistrict (风采街道)

Towns
Zhenjiang District's 3 subdistricts are as follows:
 Xinshao Town (新韶镇)
 Leyuan Town (乐园镇, or "Paradise Town" in literally)
 Shiliting Town (十里亭镇)
 Lishi Town (犁市镇, or "Plow city Town" in literally)
 Huaping Town (花坪镇)

Agent of Quren mineral bureau
The two agent of Quren mineral bureau are agent of Quren mineral bureau at Quren (曲仁矿务局曲仁办事处) and agent of Quren mineral bureau at Tianluochong (曲仁矿务局田螺冲办事处) respectively.

References

Shaoguan
County-level divisions of Guangdong